Orsolya Szegedi (born 16 February 1989 in Kiskunhalas) is a former Hungarian handballer.

Achievements
Nemzeti Bajnokság I:
Winner: 2008, 2010
Magyar Kupa:
Winner: 2007, 2008, 2010
EHF Champions League:
Semifinalist: 2007, 2008, 2010

Personal life
She is in relationship with handball coach, Csaba Konkoly.

References

External links
 Career statistics at Worldhandball

1989 births
Living people
People from Kiskunhalas
Hungarian female handball players
Győri Audi ETO KC players
Sportspeople from Bács-Kiskun County